Andrzej Nikodem (born 1968) is a retired Polish football defender.

References

1968 births
Living people
Polish footballers
GKS Katowice players
Association football defenders